Union Station, also known as Pennsylvania Station and commonly called Penn Station, is a historic train station in Downtown Pittsburgh, Pennsylvania.   It was one of several passenger rail stations that served Pittsburgh during the 20th century; others included the Pittsburgh & Lake Erie Railroad Station, the Baltimore and Ohio Station, and Wabash Pittsburgh Terminal, and it is the only surviving station in active use.

The historic station was designed by Chicago architect Daniel Burnham and built from 1898 to 1904. The station's rotunda was added to the National Register of Historic Places in 1973, followed by the entire building in 1976. In the 1980s, the Burnham station building was converted to apartment use, while Amtrak moved to an annex on the building's east side.

History 
The current station replaced the original Union Station which was destroyed in the Pittsburgh railroad strike of 1877.

Unlike many union stations built in the U.S. to serve the needs of more than one railroad, this facility only served the Pennsylvania Railroad and its subsidiary lines; for that reason, it was renamed in 1912 to match other Pennsylvania Stations. Thus, Union Station is a misnomer, as other major passenger rail carriers served travelers at other stations. For instance, the New York Central used Pittsburgh & Lake Erie Railroad Station, the Wabash Railroad used Wabash Pittsburgh Terminal, and the Baltimore and Ohio Railroad used both the Baltimore and Ohio Station and the Pittsburgh & Lake Erie Railroad Station.

The station building was designed by Chicago architect Daniel Burnham and built between 1898–1904. The materials were a grayish-brown terra cotta that looked like brownstone, and brick. Though Burnham is regarded more as a planner and organizer rather than a designer of details, which were left to draftsmen like Peter Joseph Weber, the most extraordinary feature of the monumental train station is his: the rotunda with corner pavilions. At street level, the rotunda sheltered turning spaces for carriages beneath wide, low vaulted spaces that owed little to any historicist style. Above, the rotunda sheltered passengers in a spectacular waiting room. Burnham's firm completed more than a dozen projects in Pittsburgh, some on quite prominent sites.  The rotunda is listed on the National Register of Historic Places. Service began at the station on October 12, 1901.

To the beginning of the 1970s, the station remained a major stop for several of the PRR's leading east-west trains: Broadway Limited (Chicago-New York), Manhattan Limited (Chicago-New York); Penn Texas (St. Louis-New York) and Spirit of St. Louis (St. Louis-New York).

By the late 1970s the Penn Central Corporation was accepting bids for the complex and it was purchased by the US General Services Administration. There were proposals in 1978 to make the structure into a federal office building, a new city hall and a senior citizens apartment building. Amtrak proposed that the whole structure remain a train station and rail offices. In 1974, the County Council proposed having the station be the site of the then-planned David L. Lawrence Convention Center.  The Buncher Development Company had an option to buy the property as late as 1984.

A $20 million restoration of Union Station began in 1986 to convert the office tower into apartments. It is now called The Pennsylvanian and opened to residents on May 23, 1988. The concourse, which is no longer open to the public, was transformed into a lobby for commercial spaces on the ground floor and the paint cleaned off the great central skylight. The rotunda, which once offered shelter for carriages to turn around, is now closed to vehicular traffic; modern cars and trucks are too heavy for the brick road surface and risk caving in the roof to the parking garage below it.

Current passenger service 
Union Station continues to serve as an active railway station, but through an annex on the Liberty Avenue side of the building. It is the western terminus of Amtrak's Pennsylvanian route and is along the Capitol Limited route.  Until 2005, Pittsburgh was also serviced by the Three Rivers (a replacement service for the Broadway Limited), an extended version of the Pennsylvanian that terminated in Chicago. Its cancellation marked the first time in Pittsburgh's railway history that the city was served by just two daily passenger trains (the Pennsylvanian and Capitol Limited).

Architecture 
In September 1978, The New Yorker art critic Brendan Gill proclaimed that Pittsburgh's Penn Station is "one of the great pieces of Beaux-Arts architecture in America...[one of the] symbols of the nation."

Bus rapid transit 

Penn Station is an at grade station operated by Pittsburgh Regional Transit. The station is located on the Martin Luther King Jr. East Busway and is served by busway routes P1, P2, P7, P10, P12, P16, P17, P67, P68, P69, P71, P76 and P78. 

East of the station is a bus layover area and the East Liberty Garage used by routes 1, 6, 11, 15, 19L, 29, 31, 39, 40, 44 and G31. These routes serve the Penn Station busway stops immediately before going out of service and are the first stops they make as they go into service. Routes 86, 87, 88 and 91 stop just outside of the station on Liberty and Penn Avenues.

There is also a seldom used light rail station at the site. It opened in 1988 with regular shuttle service to Steel Plaza station, as well as two afternoon rush-hour trains on the 42S (now the Red Line). However, the station was difficult to integrate into other services, since it used a single-tracked former Pennsylvania Railroad tunnel. This tunnel travels beneath the US Steel Tower, and the building's structural supports are on each side of the tunnel, prohibiting the installation of a second track. The shuttle service was discontinued in 1993, but the two 42S afternoon rush-hour trains continued to serve the station until 2007. Since 2007, the station has seen occasional use, mostly for charters or special events, such as part of the agency's detoured transportation routes following Super Bowl XLV on February 6, 2011 and as part of the "Railvolution" transit convention in October 2018.

Pittsburgh Regional Transit bus connections 

1 – Freeport Road
6 – Spring Hill
11 – Fineview
15 – Charles
19L – Emsworth Limited
29 – Robinson
31 – Bridgeville
39 – Brookline
40 – Mount Washington
44 – Knoxville
86 – Liberty
87 – Friendship
88 – Penn
91 – Butler Street
G31 – Bridgeville Flyer
P1 – East Busway All Stops
P2 – East Busway Short
P7 – McKeesport Flyer
P10 – Allegheny Valley Flyer
P12 – Holiday Park Flyer
P13 – Mount Royal Flyer
P16 – Penn Hills Flyer
P17 – Lincoln Park Flyer
P67 – Monroeville Flyer
P68 – Braddock Hills Flyer
P69 – Trafford Flyer
P71 – Swissvale Flyer
P78 – Oakmont Flyer

Suburban transit connections 
Beaver County Transit Authority Route 1
Butler Transit Authority
Fayette Area Coordinated Transportation Commuter
New Castle Area Transit Authority Route 71
Washington City Transit Washington-Pittsburgh
Westmoreland County Transit Authority All Pittsburgh Routes except Route 4

Intercity bus connections

Grant Street Transportation Center 

Across the street is the Grant Street Transportation Center. It serves as an intercity bus station for:
 Amtrak Thruway
 Greyhound Lines
 Fullington Trailways
 Mid Mon Valley Transit Authority
 Mountain Line Transit Authority

Gallery

See also 

Pittsburgh & Lake Erie Railroad Station
Baltimore and Ohio Station (Pittsburgh)
Grant Street Station
Wabash Pittsburgh Terminal

References

External links 

Images of Union Station, Pittsburgh
Burnham's papers at the Carnegie Mellon Library
Port Authority of Allegheny County Station Info
Pittsburgh Amtrak Station (USA Rail Guide – Train Web)
The Pennsylvanian

Magazine article from Railway Age (1901) with floor plan

Beaux-Arts architecture in Pennsylvania
Railway stations in Pittsburgh
History of Pittsburgh
Pittsburgh
Pittsburgh
Pittsburgh
Railway stations in the United States opened in 1903
Transit centers in the United States
Pittsburgh History & Landmarks Foundation Historic Landmarks
Skyscraper office buildings in Pittsburgh
Residential buildings in Pittsburgh
Residential condominiums in the United States
Railway stations on the National Register of Historic Places in Pennsylvania
Clock towers in Pennsylvania
Historic American Buildings Survey in Pennsylvania
National Register of Historic Places in Pittsburgh
1903 establishments in Pennsylvania
Former Pennsylvania Railroad stations
Port Authority of Allegheny County stations
Martin Luther King Jr. East Busway